The Lead Mosque, also known as the Izgurli Mosque, is a 16th-century historical mosque located in Berat, south-central Albania.

Its name comes from the lead coating of its sphere-shaped domes.
It was built in the years of 1553 and 1554 by the local feudal Ahmet Bej Uzgurliu, at the time a vassal of the Skuraj family, and is currently a Cultural Monument of Albania. Explorer Evliya Çelebi’s description told of carved stones underneath the lead, topping off a complex including a bazaar, madrasa, imaret, school, Turkish bath, and shadirvan. The prayer hall is square with a northern portico and a tall, thin minaret molded in cloisonné where it meets the roof. Many windows light the interior.

Bibliography
 Anamali, Skënder; Prifti, Kristaq (2002). Historia e popullit shqiptar: vëllimi i parë. Tirana: Toena. .

References

Ottoman architecture in Albania
Mosques in Berat
Cultural Monuments of Albania
Buildings and structures completed in the 16th century
16th-century establishments in Europe